Ochoco Creek is a  tributary of the Crooked River in the U.S. state of Oregon. Part of the drainage basin of the Columbia River, it arises in the Ochoco National Forest in Wheeler County and flows generally southwest and west for most of its length through Crook County to slightly northwest of Prineville.

Course
Ochoco Creek begins in the extreme southwestern corner of Wheeler County near its border with Crook County in the Ochoco National Forest. Entering Crook County, it flows southwest for about two-thirds of its course, roughly parallel to Forest Road 22 and U.S. Route 26 to the Crooked River near Prineville.

In its first , Ochoco Creek receives Camp Creek from the left then Aholt and McAllister creeks, both from the right, then Judy, Fisher, and Canyon creeks, all from the left. At about river mile (RM) 25 or river kilometer (RK 40), Coyle Creek and then Metal Creek  enter from the right. Between there and the Ochoco Reservoir and Ochoco Lake State Park, the creek receives Garden Creek from the right, Douthit, Duncan, and Wolf creeks and Camp Branch, all from the left, and Salmon Creek from the right. Leaving the national forest, it receives Veasle and Lawson creeks from the left and Polly Creek from the right before entering the reservoir. As part of the lake, it receives Mill Creek from the right at about RM 12 (RK 19).

Flowing west from the lower end of the lake at about RM 9 (RK 14), the creek runs through the Prineville Golf and Country Club, passes under Highway 26 and enters Prineville and Ochoco Creek Park north of the highway at about RM 4 (RK 6).

See also
List of rivers in Oregon

References

External links
Crooked River Watershed Council 

Rivers of Oregon
Rivers of Crook County, Oregon
Prineville, Oregon